Maigret is a fictional detective created by Georges Simenon.

Maigret may also refer to:

Arts and entertainment
 Maigret (1960 TV series), British TV series starring Rupert Davies
 Maigret (1988 film), a British TV film starring Richard Harris 
 Maigret (1991 TV series), French TV series starring Bruno Cremer
 Maigret (1992 TV series), British TV series starring Michael Gambon
 Maigret (2016 TV series), British TV series starring Rowan Atkinson
 Maigret (2022 film), a French-Belgian film starring Gérard Depardieu

People
 Louis Maigret, author of Traité de la Grammaire française in 1550
 Louis-Désiré Maigret (1804–1882), Roman Catholic bishop of Honolulu

See also